Willie o Couglas Dale or Willie O Douglas Dale is Child ballad 101.

Synopsis

Willie goes to court, and he and a lady fall in love.  When she is pregnant, they flee, but she goes in labor on the way, and gives birth to a son.  They go on with the child and reach his father's lands.

Motifs
This ballad contains elements from "Willie and the Earl Richard's Daughter" and to a lesser extent "Leesome Brand".

References

Child Ballads
Year of song unknown
Songwriter unknown